Maikro Romero (born December 9, 1972) is a Cuban boxer, who won the gold medal in the Men's Flyweight (– 51 kg) category at the 1996 Summer Olympics in Atlanta.

Later he changed weight class to Light Flyweight (– 48 kg) and won the 1997 World Amateur Boxing Championships. Trying to defend his title in 1999, he lost to Brian Viloria in the final and won a silver medal. At the 2000 Summer Olympics in Sydney he won a bronze medal together with Kim Un-Chol of North Korea.

Amateur highlights
Two time gold medalist at the Pan American Games (1997, 1999)
Gold medalist at the 1997 World Amateur Boxing Championships in Budapest
Four time Cuban National Champion (1992–1995)

Olympic results
1996
Defeated Eric Morel (United States) 24-12
Defeated Lernik Papyan (Armenia) 22-6
Defeated Elias Recaido (Philippines) 18-3
Defeated Albert Pakeyev (Russia) 12-6
Defeated Bulat Jumadilov (Kazakhstan) 12-11

2000
Defeated José Luis Varela (Venezuela) 15-1
Defeated Marian Velicu (Romania) RSC 4
Defeated Valeriy Sydorenko (Ukraine) 12-5
Lost to Brahim Asloum (France) 12-13

References
 
 

1972 births
Living people
Cuban people of Spanish descent
Boxers at the 1996 Summer Olympics
Boxers at the 2000 Summer Olympics
Boxers at the 1999 Pan American Games
Olympic boxers of Cuba
Olympic gold medalists for Cuba
Olympic bronze medalists for Cuba
Sportspeople from Guantánamo
Olympic medalists in boxing
Cuban male boxers
AIBA World Boxing Championships medalists
Medalists at the 2000 Summer Olympics
Medalists at the 1996 Summer Olympics
Pan American Games gold medalists for Cuba
Pan American Games medalists in boxing
Central American and Caribbean Games gold medalists for Cuba
Central American and Caribbean Games bronze medalists for Cuba
Competitors at the 1993 Central American and Caribbean Games
Competitors at the 1998 Central American and Caribbean Games
Flyweight boxers
Central American and Caribbean Games medalists in boxing
Medalists at the 1999 Pan American Games
20th-century Cuban people